Gratz may refer to:

Places
 Gratz, Alberta, locality in Canada
 Gratz, Austria, former name of the city of Graz, Austria
 Gratz, Kentucky, a US city
 Gratz, Pennsylvania, a US borough

Other uses
 Gratz (surname)
 Gratz College, general college of Jewish studies
 Simon Gratz High School, secondary school located in Philadelphia, Pennsylvania
 University of Gratz, now called the University of Graz, Austria

See also
 Graz (disambiguation)
 Graetz (disambiguation)